The Oldsmobile Vista Cruiser is a station wagon manufactured and marketed by Oldsmobile over three generations from 1964 to 1977.

The first and second generation Vista Cruisers are noted for their fixed-glass, roof-mounted skylights over the second-row seating with sun visors for the second row passengers, a raised roof behind the skylight and lateral glass panels over the rear cargo area along the raised roof, and access to the third row of forward-facing passenger seating was accomplished by a second row split bench seat that retracted forward. 

Sharing its bodystyle with the Buick Sport Wagon, Pontiac Tempest Safari and Chevrolet Chevelle Greenbrier, the Vista Cruiser was introduced on February 4, 1964, as a 1964 model, based on the Oldsmobile Cutlass/F-85 Series.  The skylight roof panel was only shared with the Buick Sport Wagon and was not available on the Chevrolet Chevelle or Pontiac Tempest station wagons. Prior to the 1973 model year the Vista Cruiser utilized a wheelbase which was  longer than that of the Cutlass/F-85 sedan.

Subsequent Oldsmobile mid-size wagons featured a skylight as did the 1991–92 full-size Oldsmobile Custom Cruiser wagon and the 1991–96 Buick Roadmaster Estate.

Reminiscent of earlier models, the third generation Vista Cruiser (1973–1977) featured optional rear-facing third row seating, while incorporating a single flat venting moonroof over the front row seating.



First generation (1964–1967)

The first-generation Vista Cruiser pioneered a standard raised roof with split skylight that began over the second-row seating, with lateral glass panels over the rear cargo area that was earlier introduced in 1954 on the GMC Scenicruiser Bus.  Sun visors for second row passengers, and a third row of forward-facing passenger seating, were available as an option. Access to the third row was gained by a split-folding second row seat that could be retracted forward.

The Vista Cruiser was available as the standard or Custom trim package, and included as standard equipment a coil spring suspension, three-speed manual transmission, self-adjusting brakes with an air scoop, and an aluminized exhaust. Cloth or "Morocceen" vinyl upholstery was offered. Optional equipment included power brakes, power steering, air conditioning, power adjustable front bench seat, two-tone paint, a choice of radios, engines and transmissions, cruise control, and a limited slip differential. The listed retail price before options was $3,122 ($ in  dollars ). Adding optional equipment could add more than $735 ($ in  dollars ) along with local taxes and license registration fees.

In 1964, the Vista Cruiser was one of three station wagons offered by Oldsmobile, the others being the F-85 station wagon which shared the "A" platform intermediates, and the full-sized GM B platform Dynamic 88 Fiesta.

From 1965 Oldsmobile discontinued the full-sized Oldsmobile Dynamic 88 wagon, making the Vista Cruiser the division's longer model; the shorter-wheelbase F-85 station wagon became the entry-level trim package of the Vista Cruiser and was not offered the raised roof skylights. 

Engines in the Vista Cruiser paralleled other Olds intermediates, with a  Rocket V8 offered from 1964 to 1967 producing from  depending on year and carburetion. For 1964, Buick's  V6 was the standard engine.

Transmission included the two-speed Jetaway automatic transmission and two rarely equipped manual transmissions, a three-speed column shift and a four-speed floor shift.

Beginning in 1966 it revived the long-standing tradition offering optional simulated woodgrain using DI-NOC vinyl wrap appearance.

Second generation (1968–1972)

From 1968 to 1972, a  V8 became standard, with a high-output  V8 from the 442 muscle car optional in 1968-69, and a  V8  available from 1970 to 1972. The listed retail price for the eight passenger 1968 version before options was $3,508 ($ in  dollars ). Standard equipment included dual master brake cylinder, four-way emergency hazard lights, padded dashboard, reverse indication lights, chrome hubcaps and seat belts, with an additional folding second row seat and lockable underfloor storage compartment in the cargo area where the optional, folding third row seat was stored. The upholstery was available in cloth or Morocceen vinyl. Additional optional items included power brakes, power steering, air conditioning, power extending radio antenna, electric clock, cruise control, wire wheel hubcaps, tissue dispenser, courtesy interior lighting, GuideMatic headlamp control, Twilight Sentinel automatic headlights, rooftop luggage carrier, floor mats, several AM/FM radio selections including an 8 track tape player, and decorative door edge guards. 

Transmission offerings through the years included one of two automatics—the two-speed Jetaway (1968) or three-speed Turbo Hydramatic (1968–72), or very rarely, a standard three-speed manual with column shift or optional four-speed manual with floor-mounted Hurst shifter borrowed from the Oldsmobile 442.

In 1969, the "Dual-Action" tailgate was introduced as an option on two-row models and standard equipment on three-row.

In 1970, an exterior redesign sharpened edges and curves.  Although it closely resembled the 1968-69 models, and is essentially regarded a second-generation car (The GM Skywagon Club recognizes the 1970-72 models as "Generation 2a"), many body parts were no longer interchangeable.  The dashboard was also completely redesigned.

For 1971, Oldsmobile brought back the full-sized Custom Cruiser wagon on a  wheelbase 98 C-body chassis, featuring GM's disappearing clamshell tailgate, but the glass-roofed Vista Cruiser continued until 1972.

A small number of 1972 Vista Cruisers were modified by Hurst Performance for support car duties at the 1972 Indianapolis 500, joining the 1972 Hurst/Olds official pace car.  Both were equipped with  Rocket V8.  Two modified Vista Cruisers are known to survive as of 2012, a press car and a medical director's car.  As of 2012, the medical director's car is owned by a relative of Ray Harroun, the winner of the first Indianapolis 500 in 1911.

Third generation (1973–1977)

For 1973, the GM A-body intermediate platform was completely redesigned and the separate wheelbase used by the Vista Cruiser and Buick Sport Wagon eliminated; all A-body wagons were now built on the 116-inch sedan wheelbase.  While its Buick counterpart was replaced with the Buick Century Estate station wagon, the Vista Cruiser was the woodgrained version, and the new Cutlass Supreme Cruiser joined the station wagon list for 1974.  Despite the shortened wheelbase, three-row seating returned, with the third row direction changed to facing rearward. The "Dual-Action" tailgate was replaced by a one-piece hatchback with a fixed rear window that did not retract into the door. Ventilation to the third row was limited to the second row side windows.

Standard equipment was updated to include a  Rocket V8, the three-speed Turbo Hydramatic transmission, power brakes with front discs instead of drums, power steering, cigarette lighter, windshield imbedded radio antenna, interior hood release, fiberglass noise insulation installed on the inside of the engine hood cover, and the availability of Morocceen vinyl upholstery. The listed retail price was $3,901 before optional equipment ($ in  dollars ), which included sport mirrors, Super Stock wheels, full instrumentation gauges, several AM/FM radio to include stereo options, power door locks, the  Rocket V8 optional through 1976, replaced the following year by a  Rocket V8, and vinyl roof.

The model's distinctive skylights gave way to boxy "Colonnade" styling, including the loss of the front door vent windows. A pop-up sunroof over the front seats was optional.

In popular culture
A 1969 Aztec Gold Vista Cruiser was a key component of That 70s Show, with the pilot of the series revolving around Red Forman's decision to pass the car down to his son, Eric Forman. The car would remain a fixture through the series' eight-season run, with many key scenes occurring on or in the car. In the sequel series That 90s Show, Red gives the car to Eric and Donna's daughter, Leia for her 15th birthday. In 2016, Rod Authority named Eric's Vista Cruiser #22 on their list of the 50 greatest television automobiles.

In the 2019 horror film The Curse of La Llorona, a blue with side woody trim first generation Vista Cruiser is featured as the family's car.
 
 An early 1970s model is used when Clark Griswold (Chevy Chase) trades it in for a new car in the movie National Lampoon's Vacation.

References

 General

External links
Oldsmobile Club of America
Television and movie appearances

Vista Cruiser
Rear-wheel-drive vehicles
Mid-size cars
Station wagons
1960s cars
1970s cars